Adolfo Carlo Barone (1861–1936), also known as Carlo Adolfo Barone, was an Italian painter.

Barone was active mainly in Naples, the city of his birth. He was known as a painter of battles and military subjects. In the 1887 Exposition in Venice, he exhibited Li uscita di piazza d'armi and Arrivo al campo.

References

1861 births
1936 deaths
19th-century Italian painters
Italian male painters
20th-century Italian painters
Painters from Naples
Italian battle painters
19th-century war artists
19th-century Italian male artists
20th-century Italian male artists